Maria Balaba (born 1 May 1988) is a Latvian figure skater. She is the 2004–2005 Latvian national champion. Balaba was born in Riga, and is coached by Galina Efremenko.

Competitive highlights

 J = Junior level; QR = Qualifying Round

External links
 

Latvian female single skaters
1988 births
Living people
20th-century Latvian women